HMS Loch Morlich was a Loch-class frigate that never saw service with the Royal Navy. Ordered during World War II, she saw service instead with the Royal Canadian Navy in the Battle of the Atlantic. She was named for Loch Morlich in Scotland. After the war she was returned to the Royal Navy and she was sold to the Royal New Zealand Navy and renamed Tutira.

Loch Morlich which was ordered from Swan Hunter on 13 February 1943. She was laid down 15 July 1943 and launched 25 January 1944. Upon completion she was transferred to the Royal Canadian Navy and commissioned on 17 July 1944, at Wallsend-on-Tyne.

War service
After commissioning Loch Morlich joined convoy escort group EG 6 based in Derry after working up at Tobermory. She patrolled the waters around the United Kingdom until April 1945 when the group was transferred across the Atlantic to Halifax. She remained on the Canadian side of the Atlantic until the end of May when she returned to the United Kingdom. She was decommissioned and returned to the United Kingdom 20 June 1945 at Sheerness alongside , another Loch-class loaner to the Royal Canadian Navy. She was reduced to reserve status and laid up in Sheerness, eventually being sold with six other Loch-class frigates in 1948.

Postwar service
Loch Morlich was transferred to the Royal New Zealand Navy on 1 April 1949. Renamed Tutira, she was commissioned into the Royal New Zealand Navy on 19 April 1949. She took part in the Battle of Inchon serving as part of the screening force. After returning from Korean waters she was placed in reserve in September 1951. She sat laid up in Auckland from 1952 until sold for scrap in 1961 and was broken up in 1966 at Hong Kong.

See also
 Frigates of the Royal New Zealand Navy
 List of current ships of the Royal Canadian Navy

References
Notes

References
 Macpherson, Ken; Burgess, John. The ships of Canada's naval forces 1910–1981 : a complete pictorial history of Canadian warships. Collins: Toronto, 1981. 
 McDougall, R J (1989) New Zealand Naval Vessels. Page 37–41. Government Printing Office.

External links
 Haze Gray and Underway
 ReadyAyeReady.com

Ships of the Royal Canadian Navy
Loch-class frigates
1944 ships
Ships built by Swan Hunter